Paisa Fek Tamasha Dekh is a prank show, web mini-series directed by Nishant Sapkale and produced by Eros Motion Pictures and Box Office Films starring Rahul Purohit as the host. It is a 10-episode based show under Eros Now's new short-format video series- Quickie where pranksters play real-life practical jokes on the people around them.

Cast and Characters 

 Rahul Purohit (Host)

Episodes

Release 
The official trailer was released on 18 December 2018. Paisa Fek Tamasha Dekh was launched on 19 December 2018- all episodes streaming exclusively on Eros Now. It was one of the first series to be released under the category of Quickie.

Theme 
Paisa Fek Tamasha Dekh is a prank show based on practical jokes. It brings out comedy through hilarious scenes and challenges.

References

External links
 

Indian comedy web series
2018 web series debuts